The Bori Wildlife Sanctuary is a wildlife sanctuary in Hoshangabad District of Madhya Pradesh state in central India.

It is bounded by the Satpura National Park to the north and east, and by the Tawa River to the west. The sanctuary, together with Satpura National Park and the Pachmarhi Sanctuary, forms the Pachmarhi Biosphere Reserve.

History 
Bori Wildlife Sanctuary includes India's oldest forest preserve, the Bori Reserve Forest, established in 1865 along the Tawa River.

Flora and Fauna

Flora 
The sanctuary is mostly covered in mixed deciduous and bamboo forests, part of the Eastern Highlands moist deciduous forests ecoregion. It is an important transition zone between the forests of western and eastern India. Dominant trees include teak (Tectona grandis),  dhaora (Anogeissus latifolia), tendu (Diospyros melanoxylon), among others.

Fauna 
Large mammal species include tiger, leopard, wild boar, muntjac deer, gaur (Bos gaurus), chital deer (Axis axis), sambar (Cervus unicolor), and rhesus macaques.
Small mammals include the flying squirrel, tree shrew, common mongoose, small Indian civet and Indian porcupine.

References

External links 

 Bori Wildlife Sanctuary mptourism.com

Eastern Highlands moist deciduous forests
Tourist attractions in Hoshangabad district
Wildlife sanctuaries in Madhya Pradesh
1977 establishments in Madhya Pradesh
Protected areas established in 1977